Tricked is an American graphic novel written by Alex Robinson, published by Top Shelf Productions in 2005.

Overview
Tricked was written over a period of four years, beginning after the publication of Robinson's last graphic novel, the award-winning Box Office Poison. It was nominated for several American Comics awards in 2006, winning two of them: the Harvey Award for Best Graphic Album of Original Work and the Ignatz Award for Outstanding Graphic Novel. Tricked has also been translated into German (Ausgetrickst), French (Dernier Rappels), Spanish (Estafados) and Polish (Wykiwani).

The story centers on the lives of six seemingly unconnected people over a period of a few weeks. As the story progresses, relationships and encounters between the characters form or are revealed, and they all find themselves in the same place at the story's climax.

Characters
There are six lead characters who switch off short chapters; one will be the focus of the story for a few pages, then another, and after all six have been featured the cycle repeats. Ray Beam and Steve are the only characters who narrate their stories.

Lead characters
Ray Beam, a rock star who has squandered four years since his last solo album. Before this he was the lead singer of The Tricks, a pop band which, in the universe of the story, released four hit albums and became one of the biggest acts on the planet. As the story begins he is dissolute, blowing money on call girls and drugs. As another character describes it: "It almost feels like money really has no value to him, but only because he has so much he'll never run out."
Nick, a businessman who informs his wife (and their toddler) that he's a fast-rising corporate executive, but who actually is a forgery artist at a sports memorabilia store called The Dug Out.
Phoebe, a skinny, nervous and naive high school student from New Mexico who arrives in the city looking for her father.
Steve, a slightly unkempt and overweight computer programmer whose marriage has ended, prompting him to stop taking his psychiatric drugs. He is an obsessive fan of Ray Beam and the Tricks.
Caprice, a waitress at the Little Piggy diner. By her own admission, she has terrible taste in men and has been drifting a bit aimlessly for five years. She's slightly overweight and extremely self-conscious about it. Caprice was a minor character in Box Office Poison.
Lily, a pretty young temp at Ray Beam's promotional office Dwarf Star.

Supporting characters
Marty Gayce, Ray Beam's manager. He's unusually honest and avuncular, nice to anyone who's helpful to Ray, and at the same time very protectful of his client.
Boris, the manager of The Dug Out. An extremely unscrupulous and surly businessman of Eastern European origins.
Richard Krinker, the co-owner and co-manager of The Little Piggy diner. He's Phoebe's father, although he left her to start a new life in the city.
Frank, Richard's partner, and the co-owner/manager of the diner.
Ivy, Lily's protective sister.
Boyd, a cute and adoring man Caprice meets while waiting in line for the restroom during a bad double date.

Story
When the novel opens, Ray Beam is mulling over the decline of his career; he's still making money from residuals, but he's unable to write new music. He's shaken up when a cute temp at his promotional office asks for his autograph - the machine that automatically signs autographs is on the fritz, so she asked him to do the job himself. Ray invites the temp, Lily, into his limo, where he does a line of cocaine and attempts to seduce her. She rebuffs him; he realizes that she isn't one of his fans. This intrigues him, and he offers Lily a job as his "personal assistant."

At the same time, a girl named Phoebe is taking a bus to the city from New Mexico. Her eventual destination: The Little Piggy Diner, owned by Richard Krinker, whom she believes is her father. The diner is well known, featured on TV travel shows, but it has a relatively small staff included a waitress named Caprice. She ends many years of awful relationships when she meets Boyd, a bartender, during a double date that's going nowhere. She starts dating Boyd around the same time Phoebe reconnects with Richard. Phoebe is integrated into the diner's life, making a little money with the waitress and hanging out with Richard and her other "father," Richard's partner Frank. As she's showing her new friend around the city, Caprice takes Phoebe to a sports memorabilia store called The Dug Out to buy a gift for Boyd.

The clerk who sells her the baseball is Nick, a signature forger who has been stealing from the business and lying to his wife about what he does. He immediately falls for Caprice and gives her a baseball card with a genuine signature, on the condition she'll have coffee with him. She accepts; it just so happens that she's tiring a little bit of Boyd. The two of them start dating while the situation with Boyd remains murky.

While all of this is happening, a computer engineer named Steve is going through a severe depression - if not a psychotic period. Bitter about his life, especially his love life, he's stopped taking his medication and grows more and more obsessed with his favorite singer, Ray Beam. He receives a signed photo from Beam's office; as it happens, it's the original signature that Ray did for Lily. Since the signature doesn't match the rest in his (very large) collection, and since Ray drew devil horns and a beard on the photo, Steve obsesses over it. A voice in his head helps convince him that this means the real Ray Beam has been replaced by an evil imposter. Steve loses his job, gets a gun from his grandmother's house, and plots the assassination of the "phony" Ray.

Ray and Lily are, of course, unaware of any of this. Ray had hoped Lily would become his muse, and lucky for him, she does. Newly inspired he takes her to a Caribbean recording studio, then to a series of exotic locations, and asks her to marry him. She says yes. But while on their honeymoon, Lily walks into a room of call girls that have been hired by Ray's jealous ex-personal assistant (who had been doing the real work while Ray fell in love with Lily). She flees, but Ray (through his manager Marty) convinces her to come to a reconciliation dinner at a place of her choosing. She chooses the Little Piggy Diner.

Before they open the diner for the Ray-Lily meeting, the diner staff start to sort out their lives. Caprice gets tired of Nick's rudeness and deception and realizes that she loves Boyd. Phoebe thanks Richard for letting her stay, but says she wants to return to her mother in New Mexico. Then the diner opens for the dinner. Nick arrives, bruised and bloody - he has killed the manager of the Dug Out in a brawl over the stolen money, although he doesn't tell Caprice this. While she tries to get him to leave, Steve sneaks in through the open door. He attempts to shoot Ray, but Nick dives in the way, takes the bullet, and dies.

The story wraps up some months later. Steve is in prison and back on medication, telling his story to a sleazy journalist. Phoebe is in college and working at the diner, where she serves two surprise guests: Caprice and Boyd, still happily together. Ray and Lily are settling some accounts in their mansion. Lily reads Ray a thank-you letter from Nick's family, for the "generous gift" he provided after Nick died saving Ray's life. Then she reads the sales figures for Ray's comeback album which are disappointing. Ray shrugs it off, and excitedly tells Lily about the new song he's working on. "I can't wait!" she says; and they kiss.

External links
 Alex Robinson's Tricked
 Interview with Alex Robinson about Tricked (IGN)

2005 graphic novels
Top Shelf Productions titles
Harvey Award winners for Best Graphic Album of Original Work
Comics by Alex Robinson
Ignatz Award winners for Graphic Novel

pl:Wykiwani